Zlynka is a town and the administrative center of Zlynkovsky District in Bryansk Oblast, Russia, located on the Zlynka River  southwest of Bryansk, the administrative center of the oblast, and close to the border with Belarus. Population:

History
It was founded in 1702 as a settlement of Old Believers. Town status was granted to it in 1925.

There were 432 Jews living in Zlynka before the war. The village was occupied by the German army in late August 1942. Half of the Jews were able to evacuate before the Germans’ arrival.
The execution of Jews from the village started in September 1941, when 27 Jewish men were shot on the outskirts of the village by a special mobile squad unit. In October, all the remaining Jews were confined to the ghetto for a few months. The liquidation of the ghetto took place in mid-February 1942, when between 190 and 200 Jews were most likely shot by local policemen who fired with pistols.

In 1986, it was affected by radioactive fallout as a result of the Chernobyl disaster. Full resettlement of the town was considered. Economy and further development of the town were hit hard.

Administrative and municipal status
Within the framework of administrative divisions, Zlynka serves as the administrative center of Zlynkovsky District. As an administrative division, it is, together with two rural localities, incorporated within Zlynkovsky District as Zlynkovsky Urban Administrative Okrug. As a municipal division, Zlynkovsky Urban Administrative Okrug is incorporated within Zlynkovsky Municipal District as Zlynkovskoye Urban Settlement.

Ecological problems 
As a result of the Chernobyl disaster on April 26, 1986, part of the territory of Bryansk Oblast has been contaminated with radionuclides (mainly Gordeyevsky, Klimovsky, Klintsovsky, Krasnogorsky, Surazhsky, and Novozybkovsky Districts). In 1999, some 226,000 people lived in areas with the contamination level above 5 Curie/km2, representing approximately 16% of the oblast's population.

References

Notes

Sources

External links
Official website of Zlynka 
Zlynka Business Directory  
Pictures of Zlynka 
The murder of the Jews of Zlynka during World War II, at Yad Vashem website.

Cities and towns in Bryansk Oblast
Populated places established in 1702
1702 establishments in Russia
Chernigov Governorate
Holocaust locations in Russia